Ponmagyi ( or ; also spelt Pone Ma Gyi), also known as Ponmagyi Shinma is a Burmese rice and fertility nat (spirit) traditionally worshipped by farmers in Upper Myanmar.

Origins
Ponmagyi originates from fertility cult practices throughout Southeast Asia. Similar rice goddesses and tutelary spirits, including Phosop in modern-day Thailand, and Dewi Sri in modern-day Indonesia, exist throughout the region.

Devotional rituals
Worship of Ponmagyi is commonplace throughout rural Upper Myanmar, especially in the dry zone regions around Bagan and Magwe. Ponmagyi is worshipped during the first to eighth days of the traditional Burmese month of Tabaung, as farmers begin their land preparation for the year. 

Her devotees include farmers, agriculturalists, and others that work in the rice industry, to ensure stable and predictable weather and bountiful harvests of crops such as paddy, beans and pulses, and sesame seeds, during the annual planting season. Devotees traditionally offer cooked rice, laphet (tea leaves) and rice flour snacks called mont hsi gyaw (မုန့်ဆီကြော်).

References

See also
Nat (spirit)
Phosop
Dewi Sri

Burmese nats
Burmese goddesses
Burmese culture
Agricultural goddesses
Buddhist folklore
Tutelary deities